Barseh (also Romanized as Baraseh) is a village in Do Hezar Rural District, Khorramabad District, Tonekabon County, Mazandaran Province, Iran. At the 2006 census, its population was 252, in 73 families.

References 

Populated places in Tonekabon County